Renato Martins Seabra (born 25 April 1978, in Marília) is a former Brazilian cyclist. He competed at the 2000 Summer Olympics.

Major results

2002
 1st Stage 1 Tour de Santa Catarina
2005
 4th Overall Volta Ciclística de Porto Alegre
2006
 1st Prova Ciclística 9 de Julho
 2nd Overall Tour de Santa Catarina
1st  Mountains classification
1st Stage 2
 2nd National Road Race Championships
 9th Overall Volta Ciclística de Porto Alegre
2007
 1st  Overall Volta Ciclística Internacional do Paraná
1st Stage 3
 9th Overall Tour de Santa Catarina
2009
 5th Overall Volta Ciclística Internacional do Rio Grande do Sul
 9th Overall Giro del Sol San Juan
2010
 1st  Overall Giro do Interior de São Paulo
1st Stage 2
 3rd Overall Tour do Brasil
 4th Overall Volta Ciclística Internacional do Rio Grande do Sul
 6th Overall Tour de Santa Catarina
2011
 1st  Overall Volta Ciclística Internacional do Rio Grande do Sul
 3rd Overall Giro do Interior de São Paulo
1st Stage 4
2012
 4th Overall Tour do Brasil

References

1978 births
Living people
Brazilian male cyclists
Brazilian road racing cyclists
Olympic cyclists of Brazil
Cyclists at the 2000 Summer Olympics